Abdirahman Dahir Osman is a Somali politician. He is the current Ministry of Education of Somalia.

References

Living people
Somalian politicians
Year of birth missing (living people)